Sharaf al-Din Khan b. Shams al-Din b. Sharaf Beg Bedlisi (Kurdish: شەرەفخانی بەدلیسی, Şerefxanê Bedlîsî; ; 25 February 1543 – ) was a Kurdish Emir of Bitlis. He was also a historian, writer and poet. He wrote exclusively in Persian. Born in the Qara Rud village, in central Iran, between Arak and Qom, at a young age he was sent to the Safavids' court and obtained his education there.

He is the author of Sharafnama, one of the most important works on medieval Kurdish history, written in 1597. He created a good picture of Kurdish life and Kurdish dynasties in the 16th century in his works. Outside Iran and Kurdish-speaking countries, Sharaf Khan Bidlisi has influenced Kurdish literature and societies through the translation of his works by other scholars.

He was also a gifted artist and a well-educated man,                                                                                                                                                                                                                                                                                                                                                                                                                                                                                                                                                                                                                                                                                                                                                                                 excelling as much in mathematics and military strategy as he did in history.

Early life
Sharaf Khan Bidlisi was born on 25 February 1543, in the Markazi province of Iran in the Garmrood village, during the exile of his father. His father was Shamsheddin, a Kurdish Beg, while his mother was of Turkic descent and belonged to the Mawsillu tribe.  

He was a member of the Rojkî tribe, whose members governed the Bitlis Emirate at the time and had ruled intermittently as an independent emirate since at least the 9th century. Sharafkhan therefore never took up the common tribal title of "Khan", preferring instead the royal title of emir or mir, "prince." He was most commonly known as Mir Sharaf (Prince Sharaf). 

Later his family was taken under protection of the Safavid dynasty. He was schooled at Tahmasb's court, and wrote in 1596:

Bedlîsî spoke of his education entailing instruction in the Quran, readings on the principles of shari'a, piety and purity. Due to Shah Tahmasp's religious disposition, Bidlisi was introduced to religious scholars, who warned him against evil people, and instead encouraged friendship with the virtuous. And once Bidlisi attained maturity, he was taught the martial arts (sipahigira), archery, polo, racing, swordsmanship, and the precepts of chivalry – humanism and generosity.

Reign 
In 1576 Tahmasb of the Safavids gave him the title of Mir of Mirs and appointed him leader of all Iranian Kurdish tribes. He accepted his title, but only two years later, Sharafkhan abandoned his previous stand, and supported the Ottomans in their war against the Iranians, offering them 400 soldiers. In 1578, Sultan Murad III, the Ottoman Sultan, granted Sharafkhan the title of Emir and he became the Mir of the Emirate of Bitlis. Between 1578 and 1588, Sharafkhan virtually led all the Ottoman wars against the Persians. In 1597, Sharafkhan gave the authority of his dynasty to his son Šams-al-Dīn.

Sharafnama

Sharaf Khan Bidlisi was planning for a long time to write a book about Kurdish history, and finally in 1597 he started writing his epic, Sharafnama. The Sharafnama divides its history into four parts. The first one deals with the five Kurdish dynasties that have enjoyed status as royalty (Saltant): the Marwanids of Amed, the Hasanwayhids of Dinavar and Sharizur, the Fadluyids of the Great Lur, the princes of little Lur, and finally, Saladin the Great and the Ayyubids. The second part lists dynasties that have had coin struck and the khutba recited in their names. (The Khutba is a religious invocation pronounced at the Friday day prayers meeting that mentions the Prophet, the first four caliphs and the current rulers). The third part numbers the families of the hereditary governors, while the fourth details the history of the mirs of Bitilis.

See also
Kurdish history
List of Kurdish dynasties and countries
Mem and Zin

References

Sources

External links
 KURDISTANICA
 History of Kurdology at the IOM IOM
 First written in the 16th century, Sharafnama remains a masterpiece in the Kurdish library, four centuries later

1543 births
1603 deaths
People from Bitlis
Kurdish people from the Ottoman Empire
Iranian Kurdish people
Kurdish writers
Iranian Kurdish politicians
Kurdish historians
Kurdish rulers
16th-century Persian-language writers
Kurdish scholars
16th-century writers of Safavid Iran
History of Nakhchivan
Safavid governors
16th-century Kurdish people
17th-century Kurdish people
Mawsillu